Drăgoi is a Romanian surname. Notable people with the surname include:

 Sabin Drăgoi, Romanian composer
 Pavel Drăgoi, Romanian judoka
 Gabriela Drăgoi
 Christian Dragoi

See also 
 Drăgan (disambiguation)

Romanian-language surnames